Point Barrow or Nuvuk is a headland on the Arctic coast in the U.S. state of Alaska,  northeast of Utqiaġvik (formerly Barrow). (The northernmost point on the North American mainland, Murchison Promontory in Canada, is  farther north.)

Geography
Point Barrow is an important geographical landmark, marking the limit between two marginal seas of the Arctic Ocean, the Chukchi Sea to the west and the Beaufort Sea to the east.

History

Archaeological evidence indicates that Point Barrow was occupied by the ancestors of the Iñupiat for almost 1,000 years prior to the arrival of the first Europeans. Occupation continued into the 1940s. The headland is an important archaeological site, yielding burials and artifacts associated with the Thule culture, including uluit and bola. The waters off Point Barrow are on the bowhead whale migration route and it is surmised, that the site was chosen to make hunting easier. There are also burial mounds in the area, at the nearby Birnirk site, associated with the earlier Birnirk culture, a pre-Thule culture first identified in 1912 by Vilhjalmur Stefansson while excavating in the area.
The settlement was called Nuvuk and it was near the "migration path of bowhead whales which would become the cultural and nutritional centre of Nuvuk life."

Point Barrow was named in 1826 by English explorer Frederick William Beechey for Sir John Barrow, a statesman and geographer of the British Admiralty. The water around it is normally ice-free for two or three months a year, but this was not the experience of the early explorers. Beechey could not reach it by ship and had to send a ship's boat ahead.

In 1826 John Franklin tried to reach it from the east and was blocked by ice.

In 1837 Thomas Simpson walked 50 miles west to Point Barrow after his boats were stopped by ice.

In 1849 William Pullen rounded it in two whale boats after sending two larger boats back west because of the ice.

Point Barrow has been a jumping-off point for many Arctic expeditions, including the Wilkins-Detroit Arctic Expeditions and the April 15, 1928, Eielson-Wilkins flight across the Arctic Ocean to Spitsbergen.

On August 15, 1935, an airplane crash killed aviator Wiley Post and his passenger, the entertainer Will Rogers, the Rogers-Post Site is 33 km (20.5 mi) southwest of Point Barrow.

Between 1965 and 1972 the US military operated a "Shooting Station", located a few miles southwest of Point Barrow as launch site for Nike-Cajun and Nike Apache sounding rockets. There is a nearby Global Atmosphere Watch atmospheric monitoring station.  It is immediately adjacent to the Birnirk site. There are still summer cabins constructed by locals and used for subsistence hunting and fishing in this area.

In 1988 gray whales were trapped in the ice at Point Barrow, which attracted attention from the public worldwide. The Iñupiat do not hunt gray whales and joined in rescue operation Operation Breakthrough which also involved Soviet icebreakers.

Demographics

Point Barrow first appeared on the 1880 U.S. census as the unincorporated Inuit village of "Kokmullit" (AKA Nuwuk). All 200 residents were Inuit. In 1890, it returned as Point Barrow, which also included the Refuge & Whaling Station and native settlements of Nuwuk, Ongovehenok and winter village on "Kugaru" (Inaru) River. It reported 152 residents, of which 143 were Native, 8 were "other race" and 1 was White. 
It did not report in 1900, but appeared again from 1910-1940. It has not reported separately since.

Barrow, a city of 5,000 changed its name to Utqiagvik, its Inupiaq name, on December 1, 2016.

See also

 Alaska North Slope
 Utqiaġvik, Alaska
 Iḷisaġvik College
 North Slope Borough
 Rogers-Post Site
 Umiak

References

External links
Rocket launches at Point Barrow
 The papers of Henry W. Greist on Point Barrow at Dartmouth College Library

Barrow, Point
Landforms of North Slope Borough, Alaska